Astrophytum myriostigma, the bishop's cap cactus, bishop's hat or bishop's miter cactus, is a species of cactus native to the highlands of northeastern and central Mexico.

Synonyms include Echinocactus myriostigma, Astrophytum prismaticum, A. columnare, A. tulense, and A. nuda.

Morphology
Astrophytum myriostigma is a spineless cactus defined by the presence of three to seven (usually five) pronounced vertical ribs which define the cactus' shape when young (the genus name "astrophytum", literally, "star plant", is derived from the resulting star-like shape). In the wild, globose to cylindrical stem is covered with a whitish flocking of trichomes. Some horticultural varieties lack the flocking.

Life cycle
In the wild, the cacti flower in early spring, so that their seeds can grow with summer rains. In cultivation this differs, and the plants may flower in summer. Plants produce one or more flowers  diameter near the apex; the numerous tepals are creamy yellow, sometimes with an orange or red base. Plants may take up to six years to flower. A. myriostigma is commonly grown as an ornamental plant in cactus collections.

Trivia
This plant has gained the Royal Horticultural Society's Award of Garden Merit.

Gallery

References

External links
 
 "Bishop's cap cactus". Encyclopædia Britannica. 28/7/2005.
 "Bishop's Miter, Bishop's Cap". www.desert-tropicals.com. 28/7/2005.
 photos on www.AIAPS.org 
 photos on www.cactiguide.com

myriostigma
Cacti of Mexico
Endemic flora of Mexico
Flora of Central Mexico
Flora of Northeastern Mexico
Garden plants of North America
Plants described in 1839